Ponte City is a skyscraper in the Berea suburb of Johannesburg, South Africa, just next to Hillbrow. The 55-storey building is cylindrical, with an open centre allowing additional light into the apartments. The centre space is known as "the core" and rises above an uneven rock floor. When built, Ponte City was seen as an extremely desirable address due to its views over all of Johannesburg and its surroundings. The neon sign on top of the building is the largest sign in the southern hemisphere and, prior to 2000, advertised for The Coca-Cola Company. It currently advertises the South African mobile phone company Vodacom.

History

The principal designer of Ponte was Mannie Feldman, working in a team together with Manfred Hermer and Rodney Grosskopff. Grosskopff recalled the decision to make the building circular, the first cylindrical skyscraper in Africa. At the time, Johannesburg bylaws required kitchens and bathrooms to have a window, so Grosskopff designed the building with a hollow interior, allowing light to enter the apartments from both sides. At the bottom of the immense building were retail stores and initial plans were to include an indoor ski slope on the  inner core floor. The building is located 35 minutes from the OR Tambo International Airport  and almost within walking distance of the inner city with theatres like the Market and the Civic within .

Decay
During the late 1980s, gang activity had caused the crime rate to soar at the tower and the surrounding neighbourhood. By the 1990s, many gangs moved into the building and it became extremely unsafe. Ponte City became symbolic of the crime and urban decay gripping the once cosmopolitan Berea area. The core filled with debris five stories high as the owners left the building to decay.

There were proposals in the mid-1990s to turn the building into a highrise prison.

New Ponte 

In May 2007 Ponte changed ownership and a re-development project - "New Ponte" - was put in motion. David Selvan and Nour Addine Ayyoub under Ayyoub's company, Investagain, planned to revitalise the building completely. The planned development would have contained 467 residential units, retail and leisure-time areas. Over the next few years, the Johannesburg Development Agency planned to invest about R900 million in the areas around Ponte City such as the Ellis Park Precinct project as well as an upgrade of Hillbrow and Berea partly in preparation for the 2010 FIFA World Cup.

The subprime mortgage crisis caused the banks not to provide the funding required to finish the revitalisation. The project was cancelled and ownership was given back to the Kempston Group.

Current status
As of 2017, the building has been totally refurbished, and is now "desirable" and "affordable". The population is reported to be approximately 80% black, and to include immigrants from various countries.

In popular culture
One of the final shots of the 2009 film District 9 features the tower. Director Philip Bloom dedicated a documentary film titled Ponte Tower. Ingrid Martens filmed the documentary Africa Shafted: Under one Roof, entirely, over two and a half years, in the Ponte lifts. A battle scene was filmed inside the tower for the 2016 movie Resident Evil: The Final Chapter.

German writer Norman Ohler used the Ponte as the setting for his book Stadt des Goldes ("City of Gold"), saying "Ponte sums up all the hope, all the wrong ideas of modernism, all the decay, all the craziness of the city. It is a symbolic building, a sort of white whale, it is concrete fear, the tower of Babel, and yet it is strangely beautiful". South African photographer Mikhael Subotzky and British artist Patrick Waterhouse won the Discovery award at the Rencontres d'Arles photography festival in 2011 for their three-year project "Ponte City".

See also
Centro Financiero Confinanzas
List of tallest buildings in South Africa
List of tallest buildings in Africa

References

External links

More photos of the Ponte Tower

Residential buildings completed in 1975
Urban decay in South Africa
Round buildings
1975 establishments in South Africa
Residential skyscrapers in South Africa
20th-century architecture in South Africa